Otmar Gutmann (24 April 1937 – 13 October 1993) was a German filmmaker who specialised in animation. He is known for co-creating the stop-motion television series Pingu alongside Erika Brueggemann.

He started as an amateur in the 1960s. As a professional he only made one personal work, Aventures (1978). It was based on a piece of music by Gyorgy Ligeti. He brought the sculptural universe of Lubomir Stepan to life as an exploration of human condition. In 1980, he was one of the leading animators of the plasticine characters Frédéric and Frédéri from Lucy the Menace of Street. Later, in 1986, he designed the character of Pingu. A TV series starring the character, which Gutmann co-created with Erika Brueggemann, became successful internationally.

Health problems and death 
On 13 October 1993, Gutmann died of a heart attack at the age of 56. He was buried at the Russikon Cemetery. His company, The Pygos Group, decided to keep producing Pingu episodes with a new team of crew members. In October 2001, the company collapsed and its assets were sold to HIT Entertainment.

References

External links
 

1937 births
1993 deaths
Clay animators
German animated film directors
German animated film producers
German expatriates in Switzerland 
Television people from Baden-Württemberg
Stop motion animators
People from Breisgau-Hochschwarzwald